Longborough Festival Opera is an opera festival which presents a season of high quality opera each June and July in the English Cotswolds village of Longborough in north Gloucestershire. It began in 1991 as Banks Fee Opera by presenting concerts, and moved forward with operas presented by a travelling company. This was followed by converting a barn into an opera house.  Audiences grew rapidly in the 1990s and, during the last decade, a focus on Wagner's operas led to three complete Ring Cycles being performed in 2013. The present chairman of the festival is Martin Graham, the music director Anthony Negus and the artistic director is Alan Privett.

Beginnings

After its initial start and after a series of chamber music concerts in the drawing room of the founders' house, Banks Fee, Travelling Opera, a small touring opera company, was invited to give two performances with a small orchestra on a temporary stage in the courtyard of the stable block in aid of the charities Sue Ryder Care and Barnardo's. A barn was then converted into a theatre, using seats from the Royal Opera House, Covent Garden, which were being discarded during the refurbishment of the late 1990s.

The original audience was mainly local supporters of the charities and about £3,000 was raised after costs, including donations which were divided between the two charities.

The opera evenings, with picnic interval, were very popular and there was demand to continue. Until 1998, the Festival's relationship was exclusively with Travelling Opera, whose productions of well-known operas in English were much enjoyed by the steadily increasing audience, which grew from a total of 400 in 1991 to 1,600 in 1997. Over that period, Banks Fee Opera presented many popular operas by Mozart, Rossini, Puccini, Verdi and Bizet.

Longborough and Wagner
If each of the British country house opera companies have their speciality, Longborough’s is its commitment to Wagner.

Longborough Festival Opera (LFO) is the first privately-owned opera house to be mounting a complete cycle of Wagner’s Ring. After LFO’s acclaimed production of the reduced version prepared by Graham Vick and Jonathan Dove for the City of Birmingham Touring Opera company, Longborough is now producing a fully orchestrated version making use of its excellent orchestra pit, which is modelled on that at the Bayreuth Festspielhaus and accommodates 72 players.

The 2007 season featured the first instalment of a new full-length Ring Cycle: Das Rheingold was sung in German and had an orchestra of 60 players conducted by Anthony Negus. Alan Privett directed, and the set was designed by Kjell Torriset. Das Rheingold returned in 2008 for a further three performances, and Die Walküre was staged in 2010

2011 saw a production of Siegfried and 2012 involved a production of Gotterdammerung. In Wagner's bicentenary year, 2013, the whole cycle has been staged; it is believed that this will be the first time that this has happened in a privately owned opera house.

Education at Longborough 
Longborough Festival has since 2003 been involved in education projects in two ways: through workshops in local schools and productions for young artists to perform. The 2012 education production was Sweeney Todd, and local children are often featured in the Festival's productions. The company runs workshops in schools and at Longborough as well as offering work experience.

See also 
Country house opera
List of opera companies in Europe
List of opera festivals

References
Notes

External links
 Longborough Festival Opera's official website

Opera festivals
Opera in the United Kingdom
Music festivals in Gloucestershire
Recurring events established in 1991
1991 establishments in England